Milton Joseph Cunningham, also known as Joe Cunningham (March 10, 1842 – October 19, 1916) was a Louisiana attorney and politician who served as Attorney General of Louisiana from 1884 to 1888, and from 1892 to 1900.

As Attorney General he submitted the legal brief to the Supreme Court in the case Plessy v. Ferguson arguing in favor of separate rail cars for people of different races.

Cunningham served in the Louisiana House of Representatives from 1878 to 1880 and in the Louisiana State Senate from 1880 to 1884.

References

 

1842 births
1916 deaths
People from DeSoto Parish, Louisiana
People from Homer, Louisiana
Politicians from Natchitoches, Louisiana
Politicians from New Orleans
People of Louisiana in the American Civil War
District attorneys in Louisiana
American police chiefs
Parish officials in Louisiana
Louisiana Attorneys General
Democratic Party members of the Louisiana House of Representatives
Democratic Party Louisiana state senators
Lawyers from New Orleans
19th-century American politicians
Burials in Louisiana
19th-century American lawyers